Stone Tower is the fourth studio album by Canadian electronic band Delerium. It was released in 1991 on Dossier Records.

Track listing

The re-issue on the Hypnotic label omits "Red Hill", "Sphere" and "Relics" in the album's artwork, but they are all included on the actual disc. On the original release on the Dossier label, these same tracks were considered bonus tracks in their own right. The track "Aftermath" (7:12) is different from the later track "Aftermath" (7:38) released on Spiritual Archives and later released under the title "Aftermath II" on the compilations Reflections II and Archives II.

Personnel 
Delerium
Rhys Fulber – instruments, production
Bill Leeb – instruments, production
Production and additional personnel
Carylann Loeppky – photography
Chris Peterson – mixing
Techno Grafix – photography

References

External links 
 

Delerium albums
1991 albums
Albums produced by Rhys Fulber